Centerstage is a Philippine television reality talent competition show broadcast by GMA Network. Hosted by Alden Richards and Betong Sumaya, it premiered on February 16, 2020 on the network's Sunday Grande sa Gabi line up. The show concluded on June 6, 2021 with a total of 21 episodes.

Hosts

 Alden Richards
 Betong Sumaya

Judges

 Aicelle Santos
 Mel Villena
 Pops Fernandez

Production
In March 2020, the admission of a live audience in the studio and production were suspended due to the enhanced community quarantine in Luzon caused by the COVID-19 pandemic. The show resumed its programming on February 28, 2021.

Ratings
According to AGB Nielsen Philippines' Nationwide Urban Television Audience Measurement People in Television Homes, the pilot episode of Centerstage earned a 9.5% rating.

References

External links
 
 

2020 Philippine television series debuts
2021 Philippine television series endings
Filipino-language television shows
GMA Network original programming
Philippine reality television series
Television productions suspended due to the COVID-19 pandemic